Deepti Gurdasani is a British-Indian clinical epidemiologist and statistical geneticist who is a senior lecturer in machine learning at the Queen Mary University of London. Her research considers the genetic diversity of African Populations. Throughout the COVID-19 pandemic, Gurdasani has provided the public with her analysis of the evolving situation mainly on the Twitter platform.

Early life and education 
Gurdasani was an undergraduate student at the Christian Medical College Vellore, where she studied medicine. After earning her medical degree she moved to the United Kingdom, where she worked toward a doctorate at the University of Cambridge. Her doctoral research involved the design of strategies to understand complex diseases in diverse populations.

Research and career 
In 2013, Gurdasani joined the Wellcome Sanger Institute as a postdoctoral fellow, where she worked on the genomic diversity of African populations and how this diversity impacts susceptibility to disease. She makes use of dense genotypes and whole genome sequences to better understand how population movements determined genetic structure. In particular, Gurdasani develops machine learning algorithms to large-scale clinical data sets. At the Sanger Gurdasani co-led the African Genome Variation Project and the Uganda Resource Project.

Gurdasani moved to Queen Mary University of London in 2019, where she created deep learning approaches for clinical prediction and the identification of novel, genome-based drug targets. During the COVID-19 pandemic Gurdasani has provided public commentary on the pandemic, making use of both Twitter and print media to share information on the evolving situation. She has researched the incidence of long covid in the UK. In 2021 Gurdasani started to write for The Guardian.

Selected publications

References

External links 
 

Living people
Indian epidemiologists
British women epidemiologists
People from Vellore
Alumni of the University of Cambridge
Academics of Queen Mary University of London
1982 births
COVID-19 researchers
Genetic epidemiologists
Machine learning researchers
Public health researchers